Al-Qahirah, Hama ( al-qāhirah) is a Syrian village located in Qalaat al-Madiq Subdistrict in Al-Suqaylabiyah District, Hama. According to the Syria Central Bureau of Statistics (CBS), the village had a population of 708 in the 2004 census.

References 

Populated places in al-Suqaylabiyah District
Populated places in al-Ghab Plain